{{Infobox settlement
| name                     = Mayiladuthurai
| other_name               = MayavaramMayuram
| settlement_type          = Town
| image_skyline            = Victory Clock Tower at Mayiladuthurai JEG1747.jpg
| image_alt                = 
| image_caption            = Victory Clock Tower at Mayiladuthurai
| pushpin_map              = Tamil Nadu
| pushpin_label_position   = left
| pushpin_map_alt          = 
| pushpin_map_caption      = Mayiladuthurai, Tamil Nadu
| coordinates              = 
| subdivision_type         = Country
| subdivision_name         = 
| subdivision_type1        = State
| subdivision_name1        = Tamil Nadu
| subdivision_type2        = District
| subdivision_name2        = Mayiladuthurai district
| established_title        = 
| established_date         = 
| founder                  = 
| named_for                = 
| government_type          = Selection Grade Municipality
| governing_body           = Mayiladuthurai Municipality
| leader_title             = chairman
| leader_name              = N Selvaraj
| unit_pref                = Metric
| area_footnotes           = 
| area_rank                = 
| area_total_km2           = 35
| elevation_footnotes      = 
| elevation_m              = 38
| population_total         = 85,632
| population_as_of         = 2011
| population_density_km2   = auto
| population_demonym       = 
| population_footnotes     = 
| demographics_type1       = Languages
| demographics1_title1     = Official
| demographics1_info1      = Tamil
| timezone1                = IST
| utc_offset1              = +5:30
| postal_code_type         = PIN
| postal_code              = 609001
| area_code_type           = Telephone code
| area_code                = 91 4364
| registration_plate       = TN-82| website                  = 
| footnotes                = 
| official_name            = 
| subdivision_type3        = Chola Nadu
| subdivision_name3        = Cauvery Delta
}}Mayiladuthurai (formerly known as Mayavaram or Mayuram') is a town and district headquarter of Mayiladuthurai district in Tamil Nadu, India.

Mayiladuthurai was ruled by Medieval Cholas and subsequently ruled by various dynasties, including the Vijayanagar Empire, Thanjavur Nayaks, Thanjavur Marathas and the British Empire. Mayiladuthurai was a part of the erstwhile Tanjore district until India's independence in 1947 and Thanjavur district until 1991 and subsequently a part of the newly formed Nagapattinam district. The town is known for agriculture, and weaving. As Mayiladuthurai is situated in East Coast, fishing plays an vital role on generating it's revenue.

Mayiladuthurai is administered by a town panchayat established in 1866. As of 2008, the panchayat 
Mayiladuthurai comes under the Mayiladuthurai assembly constituency which elects a member to the Tamil Nadu Legislative Assembly once every five years and it is a part of the Mayiladuthurai constituency which elects its Member of Parliament (MP) once in five years. It is well connected by road and rail transport. Mayiladuthurai serves as an important junction in main line connecting Chennai with Trichy. Roadways and Railways are the major mode of transportation to the town.

Mayiladuthurai was carved out of Nagapattinam district and inaugurated as the 38th district of Tamil Nadu on December 28, 2020.

Etymology
Mayiladuthurai is derived from the word Mayil (peacock). Mayuranathaswami Temple dedicated to the Amman is one of the most important Hindu temples in the town. There is a statue depicting goddess Amman in a peahen form worshipping lingam, an iconic symbol of Shiva.

 History 

Mayiladuthurai is of significant antiquity, its oldest extant temples dating to the time of the Medieval Cholas. The region, however, is known to have been inhabited since the 3rd millennium BC. Sherds of megalithic black and red ware have been found at Akkur,  to the east of Mayiladuthurai. In 2006, artifacts with Indus Valley signs dated between 2000 and 1500 BC were found at the nearby village of Sembiyankandiyur. There have been references to Mayiladuthurai in the works of the 7th century Saivite saint Sambandar. The Thanjavur Nayak king Raghunatha Nayak constructed mandapams in Mayiladuthurai. During the 17th and 18th centuries AD, Mayiladuthurai was ruled by the Thanjavur Marathas who invited Brahmins from the Telugu, Kannada and Maratha countries to settle in the region and gave large extents of land to them. In 1799, Mayiladuthurai,  was ceded to the British East India Company, along with the rest of the Thanjavur Maratha kingdom, by the Thanjavur Maratha ruler Serfoji II. Mayiladuthurai prospered under British rule emerging as an important town in Tanjore district. Carnatic musicians Madurai Mani Iyer and Gopalakrishna Bharathi and Samuel Vedanayagam Pillai, who wrote the first Tamil novel Prathapa Mudaliar Charithram were connected with Mayiladuthurai while Tamil writer Kalki Krishnamurthy, M.S.Udhaya Moorthy studied at the Municipal High School in Mayiladuthurai. According to local folklore, Mayiladuthurai was associated with Hindu holy men called "Siddhars". To this day, a neighbourhood of Mayiladuthurai is called Siddharkaadu. When the Tanjore district was trifurcated in 1991, Mayiladuthurai was transferred to the newly formed Nagapattinam district.

Mayiladuthurai was inaugurated as the 38th district of Tamil Nadu on December 28, 2020. The district was carved out of the existing Nagapattinam district and inaugurated by the Tamil Nadu Chief Minister K Palaniswami. The declaration was made earlier on March 24, 2020.

Geography and climate

The Kaveri River runs through the town bisecting it into Uttara Mayuram and Mayuram proper. Most of the town lies to the south of the river and the Mayuranathaswami Temple lies a mile to its south. The famous Parimala Renganathar Temple is situated at Tiruindalur, which lies North of Cauvery river. There is a bathing ghat on the Cauvery river. Agriculture is the most widely practised occupation.

The climate of Mayiladuthurai is generally Tropical which features fairly hot temperatures over the year except during monsoon seasons.The average maximum temperature is 39.4 degrees Celsius while the average minimum temperature is 32.8 degrees Celsius. The average annual rainfall is 1,125 mm.

Administration and politics

It is the headquarters of the newly formed Mayiladuthurai district. The town of Mayiladuthurai is administered by a municipal council which was created in 1866 as per the Town Improvements Act 1865. The council initially had eleven members. This was increased to 18 in 1883 and currently stands at 36.Hemingway, p. 213

The functions of the municipality is devolved into six departments: General, Engineering, Revenue, Public Health, Town planning and the Computer Wing. All these departments are under the control of a Municipal Commissioner who is the supreme executive head. The legislative powers are vested in a body of 36 members, one each from the 36 wards. The legislative body is headed by an elected Chairperson assisted by a Deputy Chairperson. There are a total of four revenue villages with Mayiladuthurai - Thiruvilandur, Dharmapuram, Nanchilnadu and Kornad. The municipality has allocated a budget of 2,183,350,000 for the year 2010–11.

Mayiladuthurai is represented in the Tamil Nadu Legislative Assembly by the Mayiladuthurai state assembly constituency seat.

Mayiladuthurai is a part of the Mayiladuthurai (Lok Sabha constituency).  The current Member of Parliament from the constituency is S. Ramalingam of the Dravida Munnetra Kazhagam party.

Utility services
Potable water is provided by the municipality. Mayiladuthurai's main source of water in the Kollidam River. A total of 7.50 MLD are pumped out every day from five water tanks located in various parts of the town. About 104 metric tonnes of solid waste is generated everyday, while 85 metric tonnes are collected from the town every day by door-to-door collection and subsequently the source segregation and dumping is carried out by the sanitary department of the municipality. There is limited underground drainage system in the town and the major sewerage system for disposal of sullage is through septic tanks, open drains and public conveniences. There are five government hospitals that include a maternity and a veterinary hospital and seventeen private hospitals and clinics that take care of the health care needs of the citizens. There are a total of 3,262 street lamps in Mayiladuthurai: 2 high mast lamps, 2 mini high mast lamps, 624 sodium lamps, 2,334 tube lights and 47 CFL lamps. The municipality operates four markets, namely a vegetable market, weekly market, farmer's market (uzhavar santhai'') and fish market that cater to the needs of the town and the rural areas around it.

Demographics

 

According to 2011 census, Mayiladuthurai had a population of 85,632 with a sex-ratio of 1,045 females for every 1,000 males, much above the national average of 929. A total of 7,720 were under the age of six, constituting 3,883 males and 3,837 females. Scheduled Castes and Scheduled Tribes accounted for 5.87% and .57% of the population respectively. The average literacy of the town was 83.55%, compared to the national average of 72.99%. The town had a total of 21929 households. There were a total of 29,855 workers, comprising 321 cultivators, 707 main agricultural labourers, 734 in house hold industries, 23,004 other workers, 5,089 marginal workers, 74 marginal cultivators, 485 marginal agricultural labourers, 246 marginal workers in household industries and 4,284 other marginal workers. As of 2001, there are 26 slums in Mayiladuthurai with a total population of 32,381.

The density of population is higher in the core areas along the banks of river Cauvery compared to the peripheral areas.
As of 1996, a total  (44.27%) of the land was used for residential,  (6.11%) for commercial,  (0.56%) for industrial,  (1.98%) for educational,  (2.16%) for public & semi public purposes and  (44.92%) of agricultural area. As of 2008, there were a total of 26 notified slums, with 16,434 comprising 13% of the total population residing in those. The municipal data, however, pointed out an increase in population in slum areas.

Hinduism is the major religion followed in Mayiladuthurai and Tamil is the major language spoken. A vast majority of the populace is engaged in agriculture. About 15 percent of the total working population is engaged in trade while 25 percent is engaged in other commercial activities. As per the religious census of 2011, Mayiladuthurai had 88.69% Hindus, 6.38% Muslims, 4.19% Christians, 0.04% Sikhs, 0.03% Buddhists, 0.32% Jains and 0.35% following other religions.

Economy 
	
The economy of Mayiladuthurai is primarily agro-based. The main products of Mayiladuthurai are rice, coconuts and plaintains. Confectioneries, printing presses, vehicle manufacturing units and rice mills are the major industries in Mayiladuthurai. Industrial workers form barely 27.14 percent of the town's population. Mayiladuthurai is known for a unique variety of cloth known as the "Kornad cloths" which derives its name from the suburb of Kornad where they are manufactured. These cloths are made up of a mixture of cotton and silk and dyed in bright colours.

The municipality runs a vegetable market and fish market in the town. There are many departmental stores in Mayiladuthurai. The only shopping complex is the Kittappa commercial complex which is maintained by the municipality. The Indian Bank, Indian Overseas Bank, State Bank of India, Bank of India, Central Bank of India, Bank of Baroda, Canara Bank, City Union Bank, Vijaya Bank, Lakshmi Vilas Bank, Karur Vysya Bank, HDFC Bank, Tamilnad Mercantile Bank, ICICI Bank, Punjab National Bank, Axis Bank, Kotak Mahindra Bank, IndusInd Bank, Mayuram co-operative bank have their branches located in municipal town. also the other regional banks like Kumbakonam Central Cooperative Bank and the Kumbakonam Mutual Benefit Fund have their branches in Mayiladuthurai.

Education

The first schools in Mayiladuthurai were founded by Christian missionaries in April 1819. The Municipal High School constructed by the municipality between 1885 and 1893, was considered to be one of the premium educational institutions in the erstwhile Tanjore district. As of 2011, there were 16 municipal elementary schools, five nursery & primary schools, five middle schools, one high school, two municipal higher secondary schools, two private higher secondary schools, one government higher secondary school, one government arts college, eight matriculation schools, one industrial training institute, one school for blind and one school for handicapped. The A. V. C. College, A. V. C. College of Engineering, A. R. C. Vishwanathan College, C.I.I.T. Community College,(TNOU), Dharmapuram Adhinam Arts College, D. G. Government Arts College for Women, Mayiladuthurai Meenakshi Ramasamy Arts & Science College and Mayiladuthurai Community Centre are some of the important colleges in Mayiladuthurai. All these colleges are affiliated to the Annamalai University in Annamalai Nagar, Chidambaram.

Transport

By Air 

By Road 
The newly constructed Muttam bridge provides connectivity to Kattumannarkoil which at the distance of 28 km in the north and considerably reduce the travel time to northern districts and Chennai.
The State Highways SH-23 and SH-64 pass through Mayiladuthurai. There are 2 bus stands currently one serving Karaikkal, Nagapattinam, Thiruvarur routes and The other principal bus stand is located on the Kumbakonam-Sirkazhi SH-64 State Highway. It has a total of 12 bus bays and rated class B as it has basic restaurant, toilet and lighting facilities. There are regular bus services to important cities in Tamil Nadu. There are also regular services to other South Indian cities like Bengaluru, Coimbatore, Madurai and Thiruvananthapuram. Mayiladuthurai forms a part of the Division 1 of the Tamil Nadu State Transport Corporation which is headquartered at Kumbakonam.

By Rail 
Mayiladuthurai is connected by rail with most important towns and cities in South India. Mayiladuthurai Junction railway station is located on the Main line connecting the state capital Chennai with Tiruchirappali. In Tiruchirappali division, this is one of the vital junctions after Tiruchirappali, Thanjavur as this generates huge revenue. There are lines from Mayiladuthurai - Karaikudi via Thiruvarur, making it one of the major junctions in Central region. The Mysuru - Mayiladuthurai Express connects Mayiladuthurai, Kumbakonam, Thanjavur and Tiruchirappali with Mysuru and Bengaluru. There are regular express trains that connect the city with major cities in the state like Chennai, Coimbatore, Madurai and Tiruchirappalli. There are passenger trains that connects Mayiladuthurai with Thanjavur, Tiruchirapalli, Thiruvarur, Nagapattinam Chidambaram, Cuddalore and Viluppuram.

Culture

Mayiladuthurai has several ancient temples such as Mayuranathaswami Temple, a prominent Shaivite shrine and Parimala Renganathar Temple, a Vaishnavite shrine which are located in the city.

The Mayuranathaswami Temple complex was built during the time of the Medieval Cholas.

The Punukeeswarar Temple and Aiyaarappar Temple at Koranad, Mayiladuthurai are another important ancient Shiva temples in Mayiladuthurai.

The prominent Vaishnava temples in the town are Parimala Rangnathar Vishnu temple of lord Vishnu at Thiruvilandur on the northern banks of the Cauvery, a Divya desam and a Pancha rangam and Kolikutti Vanamutti Perumal temple.

Other important festivals celebrated at the temple are Navarathri, Adi Pooram, Avani Moolam, Karthigai Deepam and Vaikashi Brahmavotsavam An yearly dance festival called the Mayura Natyanjali is conducted within the precincts of the Mayuranathaswami Temple by the Saptasvarangal Trust during Maha Shivaratri on the pattern of the Chidambaram Natyanjali festival.

Tourist attractions
Tharangambadi, Pichavaram mangrove forest, Tirumullaivasal, Palaiyar and Karaikkal are the most prominent tourist attractions located around the town.

Notes

References

External links 

Cities and towns in Mayiladuthurai district